The Montana Southern Baptist Convention (MSBC) is a group of churches affiliated with the Southern Baptist Convention located in the U.S. state of Montana. Headquartered in Billings, it is made up of about 140 churches and 6 Baptist associations.

Associations
Big Sky Association
Glacier Baptist Association
Hi-Line Association
Treasure State Baptist Association
Triangle Baptist Association
Yellowstone Baptist Association

Affiliated Organizations 
 The Baptist Foundation of Montana: the foundation offers investment management services to the Montana Southern Baptist Convention, associations, and member churches
 The Montana Baptist: the e-newspaper of the convention
 montana.e-quip.net: an on-line learning community
 Yellowstone Baptist College: a learning institution founded in 1974 to provide Christ-centered education

References

External links 
 MSBC Official Website
 Yellowstone Baptist College Website

Montana
Baptist Christianity in Montana